Crepidotus applanatus is a species of fungi in the family Crepidotaceae. It was first described in 1796 by Christiaan Hendrik Persoon and renamed by Paul Kummer in 1871. It is inedible.

Description
Like other Crepidotus, it has brown spore powder.  It grows on deciduous wood, to which it is attached at the side by at most only a rudimentary stem (it is "pleurotoid").  The cap grows up to 5 cm across and is hygrophanous, white to ochraceous when damp and drying whitish.  The spores, around 5 - 6 µm, are almost spherical and warty.  It is distinguished from the very similar Crepidotus stenocystis by the shape of the Cheilocystidia (clavate and unbranched) and the habitat on broad-leaf timber.

References

Crepidotaceae
Inedible fungi